Prys is a surname or a given name. Notable people with this name include:

Surname
 Cedric Prys-Roberts, British anaesthetist
 Edmund Prys (1542–1623), Welsh clergyman and poet
 Gwilym Prys Davies, Baron Prys-Davies (1923–2017), Welsh politician
 Owen Prys (1857–1934), Welsh Calvinist minister
 Prys Morgan (born 1937), Welsh historian

Given name
 Tomos Prys (c.1564–1634), Welsh soldier

See also
Rhys#The patronymic form